Barber-Say syndrome (BSS) is a very rare congenital disorder associated with excessive hair growth (hypertrichosis), fragile (atrophic) skin, eyelid deformities (ectropion), and an overly broad mouth (macrostomia).

Barber-Say syndrome is phenotypically similar to Ablepharon macrostomia syndrome, which is also associated with dominant mutations in TWIST2.

Signs and symptoms 
 Severe hypertrichosis, especially of the back
 Skin abnormalities, including hyperlaxity and redundancy
 Facial dysmorphism, including macrostomia
 Eyelid deformities, in
 Abnormal and low-set ears
 Bulbous nasal tip with hypoplastic alae nasi
 Low frontal hairline

Genetics 
Multiple cases of parent-to-child transmission suggest that Barber-Say syndrome exhibits autosomal dominant inheritance. Exome sequencing and expression studies have shown that BSS is caused by mutations in the TWIST2 gene that affect a highly conserved residue of TWIST2 (twist-related protein 2). TWIST2 is a basic helix-loop-helix transcription factor that binds to E-box DNA motifs (5'-CANNTG-3') as a heterodimer and inhibits transcriptional activation. Because TWIST2 mediates mesenchymal stem cell differentiation and prevents premature or ectopic osteoblast differentiation, mutations in TWIST2 that disrupt these functions by altering DNA-binding activity could explain many of the phenotypes of BSS.

Diagnosis

Epidemiology 
The prevalence of Barber Say syndrome is less than 1 in 1,000,000. As of 2017, only 15 cases have been reported in the literature.

References

External links 

Autosomal dominant disorders
Rare genetic syndromes
Intersex variations